The Men's decathlon at the 1952 Summer Olympics took place on 25 and 26 July, at the Helsinki Olympic Stadium. Now 21-year-old Bob Mathias from the United States repeated his performances from the previous games by winning the gold medal and setting new world and Olympic records. It was the second time the United States Olympic team earned all three medals in the event, the first one being in the 1936 Olympic Games.

Records
Prior to this competition, the existing world and Olympic records were as follows:

At the end of the competition the following world and Olympic records were set:

Results
Note: All scores are based on the tables used in 1952.

100m
Heat 1

Heat 2

Heat 3

Heat 4

Heat 5

Heat 6

Heat 7

Heat 8

Heat 9

Long Jump

Shot Put

High Jump

400m
Heat 1

Heat 2

Heat 3

Heat 4

Heat 5

Heat 6

Heat 7

Heat 8

110m Hurdles

Heat 1

Heat 2

Heat 3

Heat 4

Heat 5

Heat 6

Heat 7

Heat 8

Discus Throw

Pole Vault

Javelin Throw

1500m

Heat 1

Heat 2

Heat 3

Heat 4

Final standings
Standings after Event 10

References

External links
Official Olympic Report, la84.org.

Decathlon
1952
Men's events at the 1952 Summer Olympics